This List of historic buildings in Shanghai seeks to show all the significant historic buildings in Shanghai, many of which are located on The Bund, while others are located in former Shanghai International Settlement, or French Concession.

Pre-19th century

Nineteenth century

1900-1910

1911-1919

1920-1929

1930-1939

1940-1949

Dates unknown

See also

 The Bund
 Shanghai International Settlement

References

External links
 Shanghai's Historical Western Architecture
 Photos of Shanghai

Historic buildings
Shang